Tkáč is a Slovak surname (meaning "weaver"), it may refer to:
Alojz Tkáč (born 1934), Slovak Roman Catholic archbishop
Anton Tkáč (1951–2022), Slovak cyclist
Ján Tkáč (born 1972), Slovak chemist
Ľudovít Tkáč (fl. 1983), Slovak canoeist
Pavel Tkáč (born 1998), Czech footballer
Vladimír Tkáč (born 1998), Slovak footballer

See also
Takáč

Slovak-language surnames